Yang Xuejun (born April 1963) is a Chinese educator and computer scientist currently serving as president of the PLA Academy of Military Science. Previously he served as president of the National University of Defense Technology. He was promoted to the rank of major general (shaojiang) in 2004, lieutenant general (zhongjiang) in August 2013 and general (shangjiang) in December 2019.

Education
Yang was born in Wucheng County, Shandong in April 1963. He enlisted in the People's Liberation Army (PLA) in September 1979. In July 1983 he graduated from Nanjing Institute of Technology. In December 1984 he joined the Chinese Communist Party. He received his master's degree and doctor's degree in engineering from National University of Defense Technology in 1985 and 1991, respectively.

Career
After graduation, he taught there, where he was vice-president in 2009 and president in July 2011. In 1994, at the age of 31, he became chief designer of supercomputer YH-3 and later became chief designer of Tianhe-1. He has been president of the PLA Academy of Military Science since July 2017.

He was a delegate to the 9th National People's Congress. He was a delegate to the 17th National Congress of the Chinese Communist Party. He was an alternate member of the 18th CCP Central Committee. He is a member of the 19th CCP Central Committee.

Honours and awards
 1998 National Science Fund for Distinguished Young Scholars
 2011 Science and Technology Award of the Ho Leung Ho Lee Foundation 
 2012 Chen Jiageng Science Award
 December 2011 Member of the Chinese Academy of Sciences (CAS)

References

1963 births
Living people
People from Wucheng County
Chinese computer scientists
Scientists from Shandong
Members of the Chinese Academy of Sciences
Delegates to the 9th National People's Congress
Members of the 19th Central Committee of the Chinese Communist Party
People's Republic of China politicians from Shandong
Chinese Communist Party politicians from Shandong
People's Liberation Army generals from Shandong
Presidents of the PLA Academy of Military Science
Presidents of the National University of Defense Technology